"The September of My Years" is a song about nostalgia composed in 1965 by Jimmy Van Heusen, with lyrics by Sammy Cahn, and introduced by Frank Sinatra as the title track of his 1965 album of the same name.

At the Grammy Awards of 1966, "The September of My Years" was nominated for the Grammy Award for Song of the Year.

Notable recordings
Frank Sinatra - September of My Years (1965), Sinatra at the Sands with Count Basie (1966), Sinatra: Vegas (2006)
Bob Dylan - Triplicate (2017)

References

Songs about nostalgia
Songs with music by Jimmy Van Heusen
Songs with lyrics by Sammy Cahn
Frank Sinatra songs
1965 songs
Songs about old age